Kavirayani Ramakrishna Prasad (born 7 January 1969) is an Indian chemist. He is working in synthesis in organic chemistry. He is working in Indian Institute of Science. He received Shanti Swarup Bhatnagar awards in 2014.

References

External links 
 Kavirayani Ramakrishna Prasad's Home Profile

1969 births
Indian organic chemists
Living people
Place of birth missing (living people)